Burger or Burgers may refer to:

Food and drink

Foods
 Hamburger, a sandwich consisting of one or more cooked beef patties, placed inside a sliced bread roll or bun roll.
 Cheeseburger, a hamburger with added cheese(s)
 Ground beef, minced beef used to make hamburgers
 Patty, a portion of ground meat, often round, used to make burgers
 Rice burger, uses compressed rice cakes instead of hamburger buns
 Veggie burger, a burger made with plant-based meat substitute
 Afghani burger, an Afghan fast food wrap consisting of a piece of Afghan bread rolled around french fries, along with chutney and other condiments, vegetables, and often sausages or other meat.

Drinks
 Burger (grape), a Californian wine grape
 Gouais blanc, a French wine grape that is also known as Burger
 Elbling, a German wine grape that is also known as Burger

People
 Burger (surname)
 Burgers (surname)
 Bürger, a surname
 Berger, a surname
 Burger Lambrechts (born 1973), South African shot putter

Arts and media
 Die Burger, a South African newspaper
 Hamilton Burger, a fictional district attorney
 "Burger", a song by Tyler, the Creator from the album Goblin
 Burgers (album), a 1972 album by the American band Hot Tuna

Other uses
 Burger Boat Company, a Wisconsin-based company
 Burger Branch, a stream in Tennessee
 Burger Point, a cap in Alaska
 R.E. Burger Power Station, a former coal-fired power plant in Ohio

See also
 
 
 Berger (disambiguation)
 Hamburg steak, a type of beef patty used in a hamburger (burger patty)
 Birger
 Burgher (disambiguation)
 Cheeseburger (disambiguation)